= Eustachio Porcellotti =

Florentine watchmaker

Eustachio Porcellotti (19th century) was a Florentine watchmaker.

He was known for having built, in the second half of the 19th century, several models illustrating the Galilean notion of applying the pendulum to the clock.
